Wang Xinyi (born 20 July 2003) is a Chinese Paralympic swimmer. She represented China at the 2020 Summer Paralympics.

Career
Wang represented China in the women's 100 metre backstroke S11 event at the 2020 Summer Paralympics and won a silver medal.

References

2003 births
Living people
Paralympic swimmers of China
Chinese female freestyle swimmers
Medalists at the World Para Swimming Championships
Swimmers at the 2020 Summer Paralympics
Medalists at the 2020 Summer Paralympics
Paralympic silver medalists for China
S11-classified Paralympic swimmers
Paralympic medalists in swimming
Swimmers from Hebei
People from Cangzhou
Chinese female backstroke swimmers
21st-century Chinese women